Judith Roderick Wheeler (born 1944 in Cardiff, Wales) is an Australian herbarium botanist. After receiving an honours  degree in botanical science, she was employed at the State Herbarium of South Australia, before moving to Western Australia's Murdoch University and later the West Australian Herbarium. Wheeler was the leading contributor to the two volume Flora of the South West (UWAP).

Judy Wheeler's name is abbreviated to J.R.Wheeler when cited as the author of a plant descriptions.

Publications

References

1944 births
Living people
20th-century Australian botanists
Scientists from Western Australia
Scientists from Cardiff
21st-century Australian botanists
20th-century Australian women scientists